Clara Flora Lieber (July 10, 1902 – December 14, 1982) was an American chemist known for her work with Otto Hahn on discovering fission, and her discovery of several isotopes of strontium and barium.

Early life and education 
Born in Indianapolis, Indiana to Clara and Robert Lieber, she attended local schools, including Shortridge High School, in her early life. She had one sibling, Louise Lieber. Clara Lieber attended Smith College and earned an associate degree in 1923, the University of Chicago during the summer of 1924, and University College London, where she earned a bachelor's degree in 1936.

Career and research 
After graduating from University College London, Lieber became a doctoral student at the Kaiser-Wilhelm Institute in 1936. She studied barium and strontium extensively, discovered several isotopes of both elements, and used radiochemistry to investigate barium and strontium dehydration reactions. She also discovered that uranium could decay into strontium and xenon. With Otto Hahn and Fritz Strassmann, she conducted research that led to the discovery of fission and fission products. In 1939, she returned to the United States without a Ph.D. She became married after the war and served on the Committee for the Resettlement of Japanese-Americans. She was a member of Phi Beta Kappa.

References 

1982 deaths
1902 births
20th-century American chemists
American women chemists
Alumni of University College London
Smith College alumni
20th-century American women scientists